Bittsevsky Park is a Moscow Metro station on the Butovskaya Line. The station opened on 27 February 2014.

Location
The station is located in Yasenevo District in Moscow.

Transfer
It is a transfer station, connected with Novoyasenevskaya on the Kaluzhsko-Rizhskaya Line.

References

Butovskaya Line
Railway stations in Russia opened in 2014
Moscow Metro stations
Railway stations located underground in Russia